Kevin Weaver is an American music industry executive and Grammy Award-winning music producer.  He currently serves as the President of Atlantic Records, West Coast, in which he provides executive-level leadership and oversees West Coast artist development projects while pushing to expand the scope of the bi-coastal company's content business. In addition, he is responsible for the placement of Atlantic Records' music within films, televisions, and video games, as well as providing oversight on the creation, A&R, marketing, promotion and distribution for all of the company's soundtrack projects. Weaver also operates a successful publishing co-venture between Atlantic Records Group and Warner/Chappell Music. In 2019, Weaver was included in Atlantic's group entry at #9 on Billboard Magazine’s "Power 100 List", and in 2020 and 2022  he was among those included in Billboard Magazine's re-branded "Power List" of the top executives in the music industry, alongside Atlantic Records co-chairs Craig Kallman and Julie Greenwald, and Atlantic's President of Black Music, Mike Kyser.

Career

Atlantic Records 
In 1994, Weaver joined Atlantic Records, contributing to the direction of soundtrack projects from 1995 to 1998 under the Lava label. From 1998 to 2000, he continued working in the same area as an executive at Tommy Boy Music, whereupon he transferred back to Lava. In 2006, he was promoted to Senior Vice President of Atlantic Records. Two years later in 2008, Weaver was named Executive Vice President of Atlantic Records Group, in 2014 named President of Film and Television, and in 2017 was ultimately promoted to the newly created title President of Atlantic Records, West Coast.

Soundtracks 
Weaver produced the Girls: Volume 1 and True Blood Volumes 1 & 2 soundtracks, which subsequently earned him two Grammy Award nominations. Further executive producer and/or A&R Executive soundtrack credits and contributions include Avatar (Music from the Motion Picture), Paper Towns, The Hangover 1 & 2, Transformers: Dark of the Moon, Rio 2, Michael Bay's Teenage Mutant Ninja Turtles, Step Up 2 & 3, Happy Feet, Bright, and more.

His other projects include the soundtrack for Boardwalk Empire, Vol. 1 (Music From The HBO Original Series) which he produced and won a Grammy Award in 2010 for Best Compilation Soundtrack for Visual Media, along with the soundtrack for The Fault In Our Stars which featured the RIAA Certified multi-platinum single “Boom Clap” from Charli XCX.

He was also an executive producer for Ed Sheeran's one-hour NBC television special in 2015, "Ed Sheeran - Live at Wembley Stadium,” and spearheaded the deal for Coldplay's 2014 NBC concert special "Ghost Stories". In 2013, he produced CeeLo Green's “Magic Moment” Broadcast Christmas Special at Planet Hollywood Hotel and Casino, and was an A&R Executive on the Cee Lo's Magic Moment album.

In 2015, Weaver produced the Furious 7: Original Motion Picture Soundtrack album, which peaked at #1 on the US Billboard 200 Chart and also hit #1 on iTunes in over 65 territories. The Furious 7 soundtrack included the single “See You Again” by Wiz Khalifa (featuring Charlie Puth), which Weaver provided A&R services for. The single has since garnered over 4.5 Billion streams and sold over 5 million singles worldwide.[5][6]

In 2016, Weaver also produced Suicide Squad: The Album, the soundtrack companion to Warner Bros.’ highly anticipated summer blockbuster, Suicide Squad. The album boasts the highest debut for a soundtrack in 2016 and the largest streaming week for a soundtrack in history with over 32 million streams. Alongside debuting at No. 1 atop the Soundscan/Billboard 200, the album hit No. 1 on the iTunes Top Overall Albums chart in 66 countries around the world, including the United States. The album includes the chart-topping single “Heathens” from rock band Twenty One Pilots, as well as hit singles from artists such as Skrillex, Rick Ross, Wiz Khalifa, Imagine Dragons, Lil Wayne, and many more.

The Greatest Showman  – Original Motion Picture Soundtrack 
In 2017, Weaver released The Greatest Showman – Original Motion Picture Soundtrack which received an RIAA Gold Certification, marking the first soundtrack to score four weeks of 100,000-plus units on the Billboard 200 chart since its transition in December 2014. After spending three consecutive weeks at #1 on the Billboard Top Albums chart (the first soundtrack to top the chart for three consecutive weeks since Disney's Frozen in 2014), the album broke Suicide Squad: The Album’s record (33 million) twice-over for all-time top streaming weeks for a soundtrack with 39.6 million streams (up from 37.4 million the week prior). The album has reached #1 on iTunes in 75 countries, in addition to charting at #1 in Ireland, #1 for five consecutive weeks in Australia, and #1 for 4 consecutive weeks in the UK.

The 20th Century Fox musical film’s standout track “This Is Me” has seen an incredible response from critics and fans alike, including an Academy Award nomination for Best Original Song and a win at the 75th Annual Golden Globe Awards (Best Original Song – Motion Picture). Already having been streamed more than 115 million times globally, the anthem received a dancefloor-ready re-work by GRAMMY® Award-winning producer Dave Audé. The song was revealed during Super Bowl LII as the soundtrack to NBCUniversal’s promotional campaign leading up to and during the PyeongChang Olympic Winter Games, including NBC’s primetime coverage of the Opening Ceremony on Friday, February 9, 2018.

Artist Development 
Weaver has been involved in the development of the careers of artists such as Kid Rock, Bruno Mars, Fun, Icona Pop, Charli XCX, Ed Sheeran, Matchbox Twenty, Flo Rida, T.I., Jason Mraz, Christina Perri, James Blunt, Cee Lo Green, the Zac Brown Band, Jewel, and numerous others.

Awards

Philanthropy

ACLU 
In 2006 Weaver was honored with the prestigious ACLU Bill of Rights Awards. Co-honorees included The Dixie Chicks and director Paul Haggis. Weaver raised nearly half a million dollars towards the support and litigation of cases and other needs that protect Constitutional Civil Rights.

T.J. Martell Foundation 
Weaver has been a board member of the T.J. Martell Foundation since 2008, chairing the annual TJ Martell West Coast Family Day Event multiple times. He is responsible for raising hundreds of thousands of dollars to support funding for pediatric cancer, leukemia and AIDS treatment research.

References

American music industry executives
American record producers
Living people
Atlantic Records
Year of birth missing (living people)